François le Métel de Boisrobert (1 August 1592 – 30 March 1662) was a French poet, playwright, and courtier.

Life
He was born in Caen. He trained as a lawyer, later practising for a time in Rouen. He traveled to Paris in 1622 and established employment at court, for he had a share in the ballet of the Bacchanales performed at the Louvre in February. In 1630 visited Rome, where he won the favour of Pope Urban VIII and was made a canon of Rouen.

He was introduced to Cardinal Richelieu in 1623, and became one of five poets to inspire Richelieu's works. It was Boisrobert who suggested to Richelieu the plan of the Académie française, and he was one of its earliest and most active members. These efforts resulted in him becoming quite wealthy. After the death of Richelieu, he became affiliated with Mazarin, whom he served faithfully throughout the Fronde. In his later years, he dedicated much of his time to his duties as a priest.

He wrote a number of comedies and contributed to numerous others, including La Belle Plaideuse and Molière's L'Avare. Contes, published under the name of his brother D'Ouville, is also often largely attributed to him.

Works

 Pyrandre et Lisimène ou l'Heureuse tromperie (1633)
 Les Rivaux amis (1639)
 Les Deux Alcandres (1640)
 La Belle Palène (1642)
 Le Couronnement de Darie (1642)
 La Vraie Didon ou Didon la chaste  (1643)
 La Jalouse d'elle-même (1650)
 Les Trois Orontes (1652)
 L'hiver de Paris
 La Folle gageure ou les divertissements de la comtesse de Pembroc (1653) (from Lope de Vega
 Cassandre, comtesse de Barcelone (performed for the first time at the Hôtel de Bourgogne on October 31, 1653)
 L'Inconnue (1655)
 L'Amant ridicule (1655)
 Les Généreux ennemis (1655)
 La Belle plaideuse (1655)
 La Belle invisible ou les Constances éprouvées (1656)
 Les Apparences trompeuses (1656)
 Les Coups d'Amour et de Fortune (1656)
 Théodore, reine de Hongrie (1658)

References

Attribution:

Sources

External links

1592 births
1662 deaths
French gay writers
Members of the Académie Française
Writers from Caen
17th-century French poets
17th-century French male writers
17th-century French dramatists and playwrights
French LGBT dramatists and playwrights
French LGBT poets